Simon Oakes is a British film studio executive, who is the CEO and President of Hammer Film Productions.

Life
He was appointed chairman in May 2007 when the company was revived. The Hammer Film production company is a studio best known for its popular horror films during the 1950s-70s.

Since then he has worked on many Hammer projects, such as The Resident and The Woman in Black.

Filmography 
 1989: The Adventures of William Tell (video) (executive producer)
 1996: Savage Hearts (executive producer)
 2008: Beyond the Rave (executive producer)
 2010: The Way Back (executive producer)
 2010: Let Me In (producer)
 2011: The Resident (producer)
 2011: Wake Wood (executive producer)
 2012: The Woman in Black (producer)  
 2014: The Quiet Ones (producer)
 2019: The Lodge (producer)

TV-series 
 1987 Crossbow (producer - 1 episode: "The Banquet")
 1992 Chillers (TV series) (supervising producer - 1 episode - Under a Dark Angel's Eye)

References

External links

Living people
Film studio executives
Year of birth missing (living people)